Saint-Erblon may refer to:
 Saint-Erblon, Ille-et-Vilaine
 Saint-Erblon, Mayenne